The Harvard Independent is a weekly newspaper produced by undergraduate students at Harvard University. It is one of the media outlets on the Harvard undergraduate campus. It is the oldest weekly newspaper in Cambridge, Massachusetts.

Origin and history
The Independent was founded in 1969 by students and alumni who felt the campus needed an alternative to The Harvard Crimson. The Crimson at the time reflected the left-wing turn of student organizations throughout the nation in the 1960s, and the founders of the Independent felt politically alienated from Crimson editors.

As the decades passed, the weekly newspaper, released every Thursday and distributed both on the Internet and to Harvard College student dormitories, the format morphed to that of an alternative weekly rather than a standard newspaper, with illustrated covers and four main sections: News, Sports, Arts, and the Forum (Op-Ed) section. In addition, the Independent also has several themed issues each year, including the annual The Game issue for the Harvard-Yale game, the literary issue, and the Sex Issue, featuring the results of a campus-wide anonymous survey on sexual practices and opinions at Harvard.

The Independent no longer has any political affiliation.

Notable alumni 
 President and Editor-in-Chief of Reuters, Stephen J. Adler
 Political blogger Matthew Yglesias
 Staples founder, Thomas G. Stemberg
 Former Executive Editor of The New York Times, Jill Abramson
 Ben Mezrich, author of The Accidental Billionaires
 Scott Stossel, editor of The Atlantic magazine
 Richard Tofel, general manager of ProPublica
 Trevor Potter, former chairman of the Federal Election Commission and founder of the Campaign Legal Center
 Amy Finkelstein, winner of the John Bates Clark Medal
 Kannon Shanmugam, Supreme Court litigator

References

External links
The Harvard Independent Homepage
Harvard Independent Alumni Blog

Harvard University publications
Student newspapers published in Massachusetts
Publications established in 1969